Stefan Remco Aartsen (born 13 March 1975 in 's-Gravenzande) is a former butterfly swimmer from the Netherlands, who twice competed for his native country at the Summer Olympics: in 1996 and 2000.

Aartsen first gained attention in 1992, when he won the title in the 200 m freestyle at the European Junior Championships in Leeds. In 1998 he was a member of the Dutch winning relay team (4×50 m freestyle) at the European Short Course Swimming Championships 1998 in Sheffield. A year later he won the gold medal in the 4×100 m medley relay at the European LC Championships 1999 in Istanbul, Turkey, alongside Klaas-Erik Zwering, Marcel Wouda and Pieter van den Hoogenband. After missing the 2004 Summer Olympics he retired in the spring of 2005.

External links
  Profile on Zwemkroniek
 

1975 births
Living people
Olympic swimmers of the Netherlands
Dutch male freestyle swimmers
Dutch male butterfly swimmers
Swimmers at the 1996 Summer Olympics
Swimmers at the 2000 Summer Olympics
People from 's-Gravenzande
European Aquatics Championships medalists in swimming
Sportspeople from South Holland